The 1939 All-Pacific Coast football team consists of American football players chosen by various organizations for All-Pacific Coast teams for the 1939 college football season. The organizations selecting teams in 1939 included the Associated Press (AP) and the United Press (UP).

The USC Trojans won the Pacific Coast Conference (PCC) championship, compiled an undefeated 8–0–2 record, were ranked #3 in the final AP Poll, and were represented by three players on the first teams selected by AP or UP: quarterback Grenny Lansdell (AP, UP), guard Harry Smith (AP, UP) and tackle Phil Gaspar (UP).

UCLA finished second in the PCC with a 6–0–4 record, were ranked #7 in the final AP Poll, and placed two players on either the AP or UP first teams: halfback Kenny Washington (AP, UP) and end Woodrow Strode (AP).

Two players from outside the PCC received first-team honors. Both played for the Santa Clara Broncos: end Bill Anahu (AP, UP) and center John Schiechl (AP, UP).

All-Pacific Coast selections

Quarterback
 Grenny Lansdell, USC (AP-1; UP-1)

Halfbacks
 Kenny Washington, UCLA (AP-1; UP-1)
 Dean McAdams, Washington (AP-1)
 Jay Graybeal, Oregon (UP-1)

Fullback
 Jim Kisselburgh, Oregon State (AP-1; UP-1)

Ends
 William "Bill" Anahu, Santa Clara (AP-1; UP-1)
 Woodrow Strode, UCLA (AP-1)
 Jay MacDowell, Washington (UP-1)

Tackles
 Jim Stuart, Oregon (AP-1; UP-1)
 Lee Artoe, California (AP-1)
 Phil Gaspar, USC (UP-1)

Guards
 Harry Smith, USC (AP-1; UP-1) (College Football Hall of Fame)
 Elbie Schultz, Oregon State (AP-1; UP-1)

Centers
 John Schiechl, Santa Clara (AP-1; UP-1)

Key

AP = Associated Press

UP = United Press: "The sports editors and writers of United Press newspapers in the Far West today present their Pacific Coast all-star football team in 1939."

Bold = Consensus first-team selection of both the AP and UP

See also
1939 College Football All-America Team

References

All-Pacific Coast Football Team
All-Pacific Coast football teams
All-Pac-12 Conference football teams